The Road of Tears, an album by The Battlefield Band, was released in 2006 on the Temple Records label.

Track listing
 "The Road Of Tears"
 "Ely Parker/Miss Martin's Wedding/The Primrose Lassies/Mr. Galloway Goes To Washington"
 "The Emigrant"
 "The Highlander's Farewell To Ireland / Farewell To Ireland / Put Me In The Big Chest"
 "The Slave's Lament"
 "The Moleskin Kilt/The Empty Glen"
 "Out In Australia At Last"
 "The Patagonia Islanders / The Low Country Dance / Don Juan McKenna's Jig"
 "Haro Strait"
 "To A Mouse"
 "Take Me To The Sea"
 "Plane Wreck At Los Gatos"
 "Sweet Molly / The Symmetry / The Boat Leaks"
 "I Cried"
 "Mary's Dream / The Mountain Dairy Maid / The Nameless Migrant"
 "Five Bridges To Cross"
 "The Green And The Blue"

References

External links
 The Road of Tears album page from the band’s website

Battlefield Band albums
2006 albums